Hasnabad railway station  is a  Kolkata Suburban Railway  station on the Barasat–Hasnabad line. It is located at Hasnabad in Basirhat subdivision of North 24 Parganas district in the Indian state of West Bengal.  It serves Hasnabad and the surrounding areas.

History
Barasat Basirhat Railway constructed a  narrow-gauge line in 1914 as a part of Martin's Light Railways. The line was closed in 1955.

The -long  broad gauge Barasat–Hasnabad branch line was constructed between 1957 and 1962.

Rolling stock
Eastern Railway has some WDM-2D locos, which is used on the Sealdah–Hasnabad route amongst others. They were used to haul 8 coach push-pull DEMU trains way back till the complete line was electrified. The DEMU trains had two cabs at either end to control the train. But now they are no longer in use. They have been replaced by BHEL and Jessop EMU rakes, which are currently stabled in Barasat EMU shed. Doubling of this line has been started since 2016.

Proposed lines
The Hasnabad–Machlandapur line is one of the 84 new line projects sent to Planning Commission and the Ghatakpukur-Hasnabad line is one of the 111 new line surveys to be taken up in 2012–13, as per the Railway Budget proposals for 2012–13.

References

External links
 Trains to Sealdah
 Trains from Sealdah

Railway stations in North 24 Parganas district
Sealdah railway division
Kolkata Suburban Railway stations
1962 establishments in West Bengal
Railway stations opened in 1962